Periploca labes is a moth in the family Cosmopterigidae. It was described by Ronald W. Hodges in 1969. It is found in North America, where it has been recorded from Arizona.

The wingspan is about 7 mm. The forewings and hindwings are shining, pale yellowish white, the forewings dusted with light brown scales. Adults have been recorded on wing in July.

References

Moths described in 1969
Chrysopeleiinae
Taxa named by Ronald W. Hodges
Moths of North America